Mia Malkova is an American pornographic actress and Twitch streamer.

Career
Prior to entering the adult industry,  then Malkova worked in the food-service industry, getting her first job at McDonald's when she turned 16, and then working at Sizzler until the weekend she shot her first scene. Malkova was ‘Twistys Treat of the Month‘ in December 2012 and the 2013 'Twistys Treat of the Year'. She was a contract performer for its parent company, Mindgeek, during that time. When that contract lapsed in 2014, she signed a contract with another company, Hard X, to exclusively perform scenes with men while being allowed to perform scenes without men with other companies.

Malkova was the 2016 October's Penthouse Pet of the Month.

Malkova is the focus of the 2018 documentary film God, Sex and Truth about the strength of women's sexuality and beauty. In an interview, she stated that the only reason she got into porn is because she loves sex and the porn world is the safest and the best place to explore sex in all its forms.

In December 2019, Hearthstone streamer Trump and she released a duet singing "A Whole New World" together.

In April 2020, Malkova and 11 other adult/former adult actresses appeared in the music video for the G-Eazy song "Still Be Friends".

In October 2020, Malkova appeared in the music video for the Ninja Sex Party song "Wondering Tonight".

Personal life
Malkova's hometown is Palm Springs, California. Her brother, Justin Hunt, is also a pornographic actor.

Filmography

Films

Awards and nominations

References

External links

 
 
 
 

Living people
American pornographic film actresses
Actresses from Palm Springs, California
Pornographic film actors from California
American people of French-Canadian descent
American people of German descent
American people of Irish descent
Twitch (service) streamers
Year of birth missing (living people)
21st-century American women